Vriesea silvana is a plant species in the genus Vriesea. This species is endemic to Brazil.

References

silvana
Flora of Brazil
Plants described in 2002